is a Japanese monthly seinen manga and anime magazine published by Tokuma Shoten. The magazine was originally a quarterly special issue of Animage, beginning in 1979 before switching to a monthly schedule and finally suspending publication. On November 19, 2006, the magazine began to be published again, with the first new issue coming with a DVD of the exclusive OVA Onna Tachiguishi-Retsuden directed by world famous director Mamoru Oshii. On June 19, 2018, the magazine ceased printing and became an online magazine.

Oshii's manga Kerberos & Tachiguishi is serialized in Monthly Comic Ryū since 2006. The follow-up of 1990s famous Bio Diver Xenon (重機甲兵ゼノン) by Masaomi Kanzaki, Xenon, is also serialized in the magazine. Most famous published series is probably Legend of the Galactic Heroes by Yoshiki Tanaka though. Monthly Comic Ryū was launched as an "over 30-years-old readers recommended" magazine.

Serializations

Current
 A Centaur's Life by Kei Murayama 
 Alice & Zoroku by Tetsuya Imai
  by Ukanmuri
 If My Favorite Pop Idol Made It to the Budokan, I Would Die by Auri Hirao
 Kabe Sa Dōjin Sakka no Nekoyashiki-kun wa Shōnin Yokkyū o Kojiraseteiru by Kazuki Minamoto
 Monster Musume by Okayado 
 Nurse Hitomi's Monster Infirmary by Shake-O 
 Princess Principal by Ryou Akizuki

Former

 Arion by Yoshikazu Yasuhiko
  by Fumi Fumiko
 Butterfly Storage by Icori Ando
 Cagaster of an Insect Cage by Kachō Hashimoto
 Choir! by Tenpō Gensui
  by Masahiko Nakahira & Miyuki Miyabe
 Genma Wars: Rebirth by Kazumasa Hirai & Shotaro Ishinomori
 The Great Adventures of the Dirty Pair by Haruka Takachiho & Hisao Tamaki
 Hades Project Zeorymer by Chimi Moriwo
  by Keiko Fukuyama
 Hour of the Zombie by Tsukasa Saimura
 Kerberos & Tachiguishi by Mamoru Sugiura & Mamoru Oshii
  by Shimpei Itoh
 Legend of the Galactic Heroes: Portrait of Heroes by Yoshiki Tanaka & Katsumi Michihara
  by Higuchi Akihiko & Natsuhiko Kyogoku
  by Eiji Ootsuka & Subzero Kizaki
  by Kōichirō Yasunaga
  by Hirarin
 Onmyōji: Taki Yasha Hime by Munku Mitsuki
  by Shinji Kajio & Kenji Tsuruta
  by Shoko Yoshinaka
 Revive! by Koichi Igarashi
 Taishō Baseball Girls by Shimpei Itoh
  by Noriyuki Matsumoto
  by Yoshikazu Yasuhiko
 Xenon: 199X R by Masaomi Kanzaki
  by Harutoshi Fukui & Wosamu Kine
  by Funi Koishikawa

References

External links
Monthly Comic Ryu (in Japanese)
Tokuma Shoten (in Japanese)

1979 establishments in Japan
Magazines established in 1979
Magazines published in Tokyo
Monthly manga magazines published in Japan
Tokuma Shoten magazines